Tilantongo (Diuxi-Tilantongo) Mixtec is a Mixtec language of Oaxaca. It is not close to other varieties of Mixtec. Numbers are declining due to emigration to the United States.

It is also called Central Nochistlán Mixtec, Diuxi-Tilantongo Mixtec, Mixteco de Diuxi-Tilantongo, and Mixteco del Este Central.

References

Further reading 
 Daly, John P. Notes on Diuxi Mixtec tone, 1978.
 Kuiper, Albertha and William R. Merrifield. Verbos de movimiento en el Mixteco de Diuxi, 1975.
 Oram, Joy. A sketch of Mixtec grammar, 1970.
 Pike, Eunice V. and Joy Oram. Stress and tone in the phonology of Diuxi Mixtec, 1976.
¡Na kaꞌu-ro tnuꞌu ñudau! 1st ed., 2006 8 pages (Transition primer)

External links

Resources for language learning 
Vocabulario mixteco-español de hierbas

Mixtec language